Kristien Elsen is a Belgian football midfielder currently playing in the Belgian 1st Division for Lierse SK. She has also played the European Cup with Rapide Wezemaal.

She is a member of the Belgian national team. As a junior international she played the 2006 U-19 European Championship, scoring Belgium's only goal in the competition.

References

1988 births
Living people
Belgian women's footballers
Women's association football midfielders
Belgium women's international footballers
Lierse SK (women) players
BeNe League players
Sint-Truidense V.V. (women) players